612 Veronika is a minor planet orbiting the Sun. It was discovered on 8 October 1906 by August Kopff from Heidelberg. The reason for the name is unknown; asteroid etymologist Lutz D. Schmadel suspects that it may have been inspired by the letter code "VN" in its provisional designation, 1906 VN.

References

External links
 
 

Background asteroids
Veronika
Veronika
19061008